Yugoslav or Yugoslavian may refer to:

 Yugoslavia, or any of the three historic states carrying that name:
 Kingdom of Yugoslavia, a European monarchy which existed 1918–1945 (officially called "Kingdom of Serbs, Croats and Slovenes" 1918–1929)
 Socialist Federal Republic of Yugoslavia or SFR Yugoslavia, a federal republic which succeeded the monarchy and existed 1945–1992
 Federal Republic of Yugoslavia, or FR Yugoslavia, a new federal state formed by two successor republics of SFR Yugoslavia established in 1992 and renamed "Serbia and Montenegro" in 2003 before its dissolution in 2006
 Yugoslav government-in-exile, an official government of Yugoslavia, headed by King Peter II
 Yugoslav Counter-Intelligence Service
 Yugoslav Inter-Republic League
 Yugoslav Social-Democratic Party, a political party in Slovenia and Istria during the Austro-Hungarian Empire and the Kingdom of Yugoslavia
 Serbo-Croatian language, proposed in 1861 and rejected as the legal name of the language by a decree of the Austrian Empire

Yugoslav may also refer to:

 Yugoslavs, either citizens of any of the former Yugoslav states, or for people who self-identify as ethnic Yugoslavs
 Yugoslavism, various strands of supra-ethnic nationalism proposed for South Slav peoples of southeastern Europe

People 
 Jugoslav Dobričanin (born 1956), Serbian politician
 Jugoslav Lazić (born 1979), Serbian former professional footballer who played as a goalkeeper
 Jugoslav Vasović (born 1974), Serbian retired water polo player who played for FR Yugoslavia at the 2000 Summer Olympics
 Jugoslav Vlahović (born 1949), Serbian artist, illustrator, photographer, and former rock musician

See also
 South Slavs, a subgroup of Slavic peoples who speak the South Slavic languages
 Yugoslav literature (disambiguation)
 Yugoslavia (disambiguation)
 Yugoslavian cuisine (disambiguation)
 Yugoslavs (disambiguation)

Language and nationality disambiguation pages